Byington Vineyard & Winery is a  vineyard and winery in the Santa Cruz Mountains AVA above Silicon Valley in California.

History
In 1958, Bill and Mary Byington, purchased  surrounded by redwood forests as a family retreat. In the early 1970s, a well-known Santa Cruz Mountains winemaker approached the family, wanting to lease a portion of their land for vineyards.  Almost 20 years after leaving his family farm in Idaho, Bill planted  of Pinot Noir on the southernmost tip of the rugged Santa Cruz Mountains terrain. Byington Vineyard & Winery was established with its vintage 1987 release.

Wines
Byington crafts elegant and distinctive Santa Cruz Mountain appellation Pinot Noir, Chardonnay and Cabernet Sauvignon. Production also includes varietals from California's wine growing regions including the Napa Valley, Sonoma, Santa Barbara and San Luis Obispo Counties.

References

Further reading

External links
Byington Vineyard & Winery
California Wineries

Wineries in Santa Cruz Mountains
Companies based in Santa Cruz County, California